José Juan Navarro Batista (born 14 April 1981 in Arucas, Las Palmas) is a Spanish weightlifter. Navarro represented Spain at the 2008 Summer Olympics in Beijing, where he competed for the men's middle heavyweight category (94 kg). Navarro placed tenth in this event, as he successfully lifted 173 kg in the single-motion snatch, and hoisted 210 kg in the two-part, shoulder-to-overhead clean and jerk, for a total of 383 kg.

References

External links
NBC 2008 Olympics profile

Spanish male weightlifters
1981 births
Living people
Olympic weightlifters of Spain
Weightlifters at the 2008 Summer Olympics
People from Arucas, Las Palmas
Sportspeople from the Province of Las Palmas
Mediterranean Games silver medalists for Spain
Mediterranean Games medalists in weightlifting
Competitors at the 2005 Mediterranean Games
21st-century Spanish people